Futsal Clube Azeméis is a futsal team based in the city of Oliveira de Azeméis, Portugal, that plays in the Portuguese Futsal First Division.

Current squad

Out on loan

References

External links
 Zerozero

Futsal clubs in Portugal